Stomopteryx pallidella is a moth of the family Gelechiidae. It was described by Hans Georg Amsel in 1959 and is found in Iran.

References

Moths described in 1959
Stomopteryx